Alfredo Rafael Hernández García (born 18 June 1935) is a Mexican former football midfielder who played for Mexico in the 1958 and 1962 FIFA World Cups. He also played for Club León and C.F. Monterrey.

References

External links

1935 births
Mexican footballers
Mexico international footballers
Association football midfielders
Club León footballers
C.F. Monterrey players
Liga MX players
1958 FIFA World Cup players
1962 FIFA World Cup players
Living people